HMS K16 was a K class submarine built by William Beardmore and Company, Dalmuir. She was laid down in June 1916 and commissioned on 13 April 1918.

The only incident that occurred with K16 was a sudden dive in Gare Loch after her hydroplanes failed. She surfaced successfully. K16 paid off on 12 December 1920. She was sold on 22 August 1924 and was resold in September 1924 in Charlestown.

Design
K16 displaced  when at the surface and  while submerged. The submarine was powered by two oil-fired Yarrow Shipbuilders boilers each supplying one geared Brown-Curtis or Parsons steam turbine; this developed 10,500 shaft horsepower (7,800 kW) to drive two  screws. Submerged power came from four electric motors each producing . It was also had an  diesel engine to be used when steam was being raised, or instead of raising steam.

K16 was armed with ten  torpedo tubes, two  deck guns, and a  anti-aircraft gun. The torpedo tubes were mounted in the bows, the midship section firing to the beam, and two were in a rotating mounting on the deck. Its complement was fifty-nine crew members.

References

Bibliography
 

 

British K-class submarines
Ships built on the River Clyde
1917 ships
Royal Navy ship names